Lakeside Union Elementary School District is a public school district based in the semi-rural town of Hanford in Kings County, California, United States. It consists of a single school serving students in grades kindergarten through 8. It is governed by a five-member elected board.

References

External links
 

School districts in Kings County, California